Backoffice may refer to:

 Back office, a part of a corporation
 Back office application, a software application that does not have a direct relation to customers
 Microsoft BackOffice Server